America's Medicated Kids is a British documentary that was televised on 18 April 2010. The Louis Theroux documentary ran for 60 minutes.  The documentary follows Theroux as he travels to one of America's leading children's psychiatric treatment centres, in Pittsburgh, Pennsylvania, and investigates the effects of putting children diagnosed with mental health disorders on prescription medication and the impact that medicating the child has on the family group.

Ratings
America's Medicated Kids attracted an audience of 2.098 million viewers (8.1%) in the 9pm hour time slot.

Reception
The documentary was met with mostly positive responses.

References

External links
 

Louis Theroux's BBC Two specials
BBC television documentaries
2010 television specials
Documentary films about drugs
Documentary films about children
Documentary films about health care
Films set in the United States
Television episodes set in Pittsburgh
BBC travel television series